dotdigital (DOTD) is an online marketing company listed on the Alternative Investment Market (AIM) of the London Stock Exchange as dotdigital Group PLC. It is an email, marketing automation, and customer engagement service provider, and in 2015 was the UK's largest email marketing automation provider with a capitalization of about £290m.

The company headquarters is at No.1 London Bridge, with offices in London, Croydon, Manchester, Cheltenham, New York, Los Angeles, Melbourne, Sydney, Cape Town, and Warsaw.

History
The company was founded in 1999 by David Ivy, Lewis Barclay, Simon Bird, Iain Anderson and Colin Dawson as Ellipsis Media, a web design agency based in Croydon, United Kingdom. Within twelve months Tink Taylor joined the directors. Briefly Dan Gerrett accompanied him as an early employee. Afterward the company was renamed to dotmailer.

Its mail provider was launched in 2002, built especially for the BBC.

In 2008 dotmailer became a PLUS market listed PLC, opened its first Manchester office and was included in Deloitte's Technology Fast 500.

The company was listed on the London Stock Exchange in 2009. In that year it also opened its third office in Edinburgh, introduced share options for staff and was the recipient of a National Business Award.

In 2010 dotmailer opened offices in Belarus and London (the Belarusian office was closed in 2023). The company was then AIM listed in 2011, and the platform was translated into eight languages – English UK, English US, German, French, Spanish, Italian, Portuguese and Russian.

In 2012 the company employed about 100 people, and served about 3,000 customers. In 2013 an office was opened in New York,  and dotmailer was nominated in the European Business Awards.

By 2014, the company had grown to a market capitalization of £100m.  An office was opened in London Bridge.  Also in 2014, dotmailer was noted as one of the three top mailer services in G2 Crowd’s crowdsourced business software ratings.

In July 2014 the company employed about 200 people. Its clients include BP, ODEON and Santander.

In early 2019 the company was rebranded again to dotdigital, as it focused on a move towards omnichannel marketing. It now employs close to 400 people.

Software tools and integration
The dotdigital Engagement Cloud platform has been integrated with a number of software products, starting with Microsoft Dynamics in 2009. This was followed by Salesforce, and in 2015 Magento.

The company introduced its surveys and forms tool in 2011. In 2014, the platform was relaunched with a number of new features, including the drag and drop Automated Program Builder which enables users to create automated communications to target specific market segments, customer behaviours or trigger emails on certain dates. In 2014 the Customer Insight Module was added. which allows marketers to analyse customer data on a behavioural or demographic basis.

References

External links

Companies based in London
Companies based in the London Borough of Croydon
Digital marketing companies of the United Kingdom
Companies listed on the Alternative Investment Market